Giorgi Shashiashvili ( born 1 September 1979) is a Georgian football coach and a former player who played for the national football team of Georgia. He was an all round central defender who can also play as a right back. In February 2022 he was appointed as manager of Samtredia.

References

External links

Footballers from Georgia (country)
Expatriate footballers from Georgia (country)
Georgia (country) international footballers
Association football defenders
FC Dinamo Tbilisi players
FC Spartak Vladikavkaz players
FC Chornomorets Odesa players
SK Sturm Graz players
Ergotelis F.C. players
Russian Premier League players
Ukrainian Premier League players
Austrian Football Bundesliga players
Super League Greece players
Expatriate footballers in Russia
Expatriate footballers in Ukraine
Expatriate sportspeople from Georgia (country) in Ukraine
Expatriate footballers in Austria
Expatriate footballers in Greece
1979 births
Footballers from Tbilisi
Living people
Football managers from Georgia (country)